"Stylo" is the first single from British virtual band Gorillaz's third studio album Plastic Beach. The song features guest vocals from Bobby Womack and Mos Def. The single was released on 26 January 2010.

Production
Bobby Womack knew nothing about Gorillaz and was initially unsure about the collaboration; however, his granddaughter liked Gorillaz and convinced him to do it. Womack was told to sing whatever was on his mind during the recording of "Stylo". "I was in there for an hour going crazy about love and politics, getting it off my chest", said Womack. After an hour of recording, Womack, a diabetic, started to pass out. He was sat down and given a banana, before waking up minutes later.

Music and lyrical content
Fictional band member Murdoc Niccals stated the following about "Stylo" in a track-by-track commentary:  Reggae singer Eddy Grant claimed that this song bears similarities to his 1983 song "Time Warp" stating that "I am outraged that the Gorillaz have infringed the copyright of my song Time Warp, claiming their song Stylo to be an original composition" and within weeks of its release he began consulting lawyers.

Release
A demo form of the track, then just a rough beat, was premiered on the Zane Lowe show on 14 January 2009, along with "Electric Shock" and "Broken". About a week before the official premiere, Parlophone president Miles Leonard described the song as "a dark, twisted track that sounds like the 'Saturday Night Fever' soundtrack on MDMA". The single was leaked onto the internet on 20 January 2010. Murdoc stated on his Twitter account, "A leak! A leak! Plastic Beach has sprung a leak! One of those Russian pirates has put a bullet hole on my island! My single's leaked! 'STYLO!'" He later added, "If anyone's going to leak my single, it'll be me!" The song's official premiere was on NME Radio that same day, shortly followed by its addition onto the Gorillaz official website. Gorillaz manager Chris Morrison said of the leak, "I just think that illegal downloading and pirating could be stopped, without a doubt. We have to take the gloves off and say it has to be stopped." On 26 January 2010 Stylo was released for digital download from iTunes. When the video was released, it received regular airplay on MTV and Viva. However, the video no longer received significant airplay after failing to make the Top 100 in the UK. The song was performed on the 22 April 2010 episode of The Colbert Report by members of the band. "Stylo" is a playable song in DJ Hero 2.

Reception
"Stylo" was met with mainly positive reviews, as well as noticed as one of the key points of the album. Pitchfork gave it a 7 out of 10, saying "There's not a Gorillaz song that can trace its lineage to one geographic place, and "Stylo" feels drawn from the time when people thought hip-hop might turn the Bronx into a borderless musical melting pot."

Rolling Stone gave the song a positive 4/5 star review.

It mainly failed to chart successfully, "bubbling under" the Billboard Hot 100 at #103, and only reaching 24 on the US Billboard Alternative Songs chart. It was however the first Gorillaz song to reach any Japanese chart, rising to number eight on the Japan Hot 100. It was also successful in Mexico where it reached number 7 on the Ingles Airplay chart. In other countries, it was near the bottom or middle of the chart. It is the fifth song by Gorillaz to reach any American chart position.

The song reached number 78 on the Triple J Hottest 100, 2010.

In February 2011, music video blog Yes, We've Got a Video! ranked the song's music video at number eight in their top 30 videos of 2010. The video was praised as "awesome" and "thrilling".

Live performances
"Stylo" was performed live throughout the Escape to Plastic Beach world tour. Bobby Womack toured alongside Gorillaz for the duration of the tour, with Mos Def appearing for select dates. Rapper Bootie Brown, who had previously collaborated with Gorillaz on their single "Dirty Harry", frequently performed Mos Def's verses in his absence.

For Humanz Tour and The Now Now Tour, the late Bobby Womack's verses were performed by Peven Everett, who featured in the Gorillaz single "Strobelite".

Music video
On 14 December 2009, California-based newspaper Desert Dispatch reported that a Gorillaz video shoot had taken place on 12 December in Calico, a ghost town in San Bernardino County, California. A representative from the production company said the video had a Mad Max theme. The main portion of the video, a car chase, has been compared to the car chase scene in the 2005 Australian horror film Wolf Creek. 

The first preview of the video was a set of animated storyboards that were shown in a press-only Plastic Beach exhibition in London. On 15 February 2010 Murdoc made a series of posts in Twitter about the upcoming video before releasing a trailer for it. The posts described him, Cyborg Noodle, and 2-D being chased through a Californian desert by an antagonist referred to only as "HIM". A second trailer was released on 27 February, revealing the animation style to be 3D CGI, a first for the band. Babelgum was expected to premiere the video on  February, however they postponed their release to 4 March. The premiere took place on 1 March on the official Gorillaz YouTube page. The video was nominated at the 53rd Grammy Awards in the category of Short Form Music Video. The ceremony took place on 13 February 2011. The video lost to Lady Gaga's "Bad Romance".

The music video depicts a fast-paced car chase on a Californian desert road. Murdoc, 2-D, and Cyborg Noodle (with a bullet hole in her head) are speeding down the road in a bullet-riddled, smoking 1969 Chevrolet Camaro with the word "Stylo" on the front grille. They encounter an inept police officer (played by actor Jason Nott) who pursues the speeding band in a Dodge Coronet police car. Cyborg Noodle, while Murdoc is trying to pull her back in the car and pull over, shoots at the police officer's vehicle, running it off the side of the road. Bruce Willis, in a red 1968 Chevrolet El Camino, chases down and shoots at the Gorillaz, as the sky turns black with a spectral fog and the android Noodle malfunctions and collapses. As Willis and the Gorillaz race across the desert, the policeman crawls towards his spilled box of doughnuts. Before he can reach it, a shadowy masked figure (the "Boogieman") appears out of the earth and envelops the stunned policeman in a black fog, similar to that in the sky. The video ends with the Stylo car running off the side of the road and into the ocean, as Willis looks on contentedly. The car, submerged underwater, transforms into a shark-like craft and swims out of view. During the video, references are made to three other tracks on the album:

 As he is being run off the road, the officer crashes through and wrecks a billboard poster of "Superfast Jellyfish".
 There is a sign labeled "Sweepstakes" that can be seen when the scene of the police officer's wrecked car is returned to.
 At the end of the clip, the submerged car that was occupied by the animated members of the Gorillaz transforms into a shark-shaped submarine, which is also seen in the music video for "On Melancholy Hill".

The video was directed by Jamie Hewlett and produced by Cara Speller. The live action was created through HSI Productions in Los Angeles and the animation by Passion Pictures in London.

Track listing
 Promotional CD single
 "Stylo" (radio edit) – 3:53
 "Stylo" (album version) – 4:30
 "Stylo" (instrumental) – 4:30

 Promotional CD single – remixes
 "Stylo" (Labrinth SNES Remix) (featuring Tinie Tempah) – 4:15
 "Stylo" (Alex Metric Remix) – 6:15
 "Stylo" (DJ Kofi Remix) – 3:44
 "Stylo" (Chiddy Bang Remix) – 3:36

 10" vinyl
 "Stylo" (radio edit) – 3:53
 "Stylo" (instrumental) – 4:30

 12" vinyl
 A1. "Stylo" (radio edit) – 3:53
 A2. "Stylo" (Labrinth SNES Remix) (featuring Tinie Tempah) – 4:15
 A3. "Stylo" (Tenkah Remix) – 4:48
 A4. "Stylo" (Alex Metric Remix) – 6:15
 A5. "Stylo" (Chiddy Bang Remix) – 3:36
 A6. "Stylo" (Death Metal Disco Scene Remix) – 7:53
 B1. "Stylo" (instrumental) – 4:30
 B2. "Stylo" (Annie Mac Minimix) – 5:05
 B3. "Stylo" (DJ Kofi Remix) – 3:44
 B4. "Stylo" (Yuksek Remix) – 5:07
 B5. "Stylo" (Tong and Rogers Wonderland Mix) – 4:12
 B6. "Stylo" (Louis La Roche 'Better Late Than Never' Remix) – 3:28

Personnel
Damon Albarn – vocals, keyboards
Mos Def – vocals
Bobby Womack – vocals
Stephen Sedgwick – programming, recording
Jason Cox – mixing, recording
Howie Weinberg – mastering
 Michael Makowski – recording assistance

Charts

References

2010 singles
Gorillaz songs
Mos Def songs
Bobby Womack songs
Songs written by Damon Albarn
Songs written by Mos Def
Songs written by Bobby Womack
2009 songs
Parlophone singles
Music videos featuring gynoids
Electro songs
British synth-pop songs
Dub songs
English rock songs
Songs involved in plagiarism controversies